Miguel Ângelo Danif Carvalho Abreu (born 1 October 1993) is a Portuguese professional footballer who plays for Cypriot club Onisilos Sotira as a midfielder.

Career statistics

Club

References

External links
Portuguese League profile 

1993 births
Living people
People from Seixal
Portuguese footballers
Association football midfielders
Amora F.C. players
C.F. Os Armacenenses players
Gil Vicente F.C. players
F.C. Arouca players
Onisilos Sotira players
Liga Portugal 2 players
Campeonato de Portugal (league) players
Portuguese expatriate footballers
Expatriate footballers in Cyprus
Portuguese expatriate sportspeople in Cyprus
Sportspeople from Setúbal District